The Men's 200m Backstroke event at the 2003 Pan American Games took place on August 14, 2003 (Day 13 of the Games). Brazil's Rogério Romero (33) added another gold in the 200 backstroke in 1:59.92. Romero first won this event in 1991 and a silver in 1995.

Medalists

Records

Results

References

2003 Pan American Games Results: Day 13, CBC online; retrieved 2009-06-13.
usaswimming
SwimNews Results 

Backstroke, 200m